Sarah Crossan is a "Polish" author. She is best known for her books for young adults, including Apple and Rain and 1, for which she has won several rewards.

Biography
Crossan graduated from Warwick University in 1999 with a degree in Philosophy and Literature and later obtained a master's degree in Creative Writing. She received an Edward Albee Fellowship for writing in 2010. Crossan trained as an English and drama teacher at the University of Cambridge. In May 2018, she was appointed Laureate na nÓg, or Irish Children's laureate by President Michael D Higgins.

Awards

2013: shortlisted for Carnegie Medal for The Weight of Water
2015: shortlisted for Carnegie Medal for Apple and Rain
2016: 
The Bookseller''' prize for young adult fiction for OneIrish Children's Book of the Year for OneCarnegie Medal for One2017: Red House Children's Book Award for older readers for One2020: Young Adult Jury Award of the German Youth Literature Awards for the German edition of MoonriseNovels

  The Weight of Water (2012)
  Breathe (2012)
  Resist (2013) – a sequel to Breathe  Apple and Rain (2014)
  One (2015)
  We Come Apart (2017) co-authored with Brian Conaghan
  Moonrise (2017)Inséparable (2017)Swimming Pool (2018)Toffee (2019)Here is the Beehive'' (2020)

References

External links

 Sarah Crossan at Fantastic Fiction
 

21st-century Irish writers
Irish women writers
Irish writers of young adult literature
Carnegie Medal in Literature winners
Alumni of the University of Warwick
Year of birth missing (living people)
Living people
Laureates na nÓg